The Mazda Z-series is a smaller gasoline inline-four engine ranging in displacements from 1.3 L to 1.6 L. They are the evolution of the cast-iron block B-engine.

The Z-engine has 16-valves operated by dual overhead camshafts, which are in turn driven by a timing chain (ZJ/Z6/ZY only). The block of the 98-02 Z5, ZM and ZL engine is cast iron same as the earlier B series of engines.  

Other Z engines have aluminum alloy block and head, with cast-iron cylinder liners.
The block features split upper and lower block assembly for added strength and rigidity, special long intake manifold for added torque, S-VT continuous variable valve timing, and a stainless steel 4:1 exhaust header.

In 2011, Mazda started to introduce the SkyActiv G-engine as a new, more economical option with vehicles that also ran the Mazda Z-engine. Production was finally halted in 2014, being the last year of the Demio/Mazda2, Verisa as well as Axela/Mazda3 of their generations. From here on in, Mazda moved on to the full SkyActiv architecture vehicles including running only the aforementioned SkyActiv G-engine but now offering it in also larger displacements, as well as a new SkyActiv D-engine turbo-diesel.

Z5
The   Z5-DE was used in the 1995-1998 Mazda Protegé, Mazda Lantis (Astina) and in Mazda Familia Neo (1994–1997).

The Z5 engine was introduced as the first of a newer line of Mazda Z-series engines. The Z series was a new design based on the B-series block, block internals and oil-pan and a different DOHC head.  Early versions of this motor had a chain driven exhaust cam.

The block is cast iron, the oil-pan is a 2-piece design with an upper aluminum and lower stamped steel, piston oil squirters are standard. The cylinder head was a compact design with round intake and exhaust ports. There was also lean-burn version introduced in August 1995; this model produces  and sees gas mileage improvements of ten to fifteen percent in the standard Japanese test cycle.

ZJ

The  ZJ  is available with either continuous cam-phasing VVT ZJ-VE  or a high-efficiency Miller cycle ZJ-VEM .

Applications:
 2003–present Mazda Demio ZJ-VE
 2007–present Mazda Demio ZJ-VEM

ZY
  ZY-VE 
 Used in the Demio/Mazda2 (2002-2014), Verisa and Axela/Mazda3

ZL
  EEC,  JIS, ZL-DE 

  JIS ZL-VE 
The 1.5 L ZL-VE makes more power than the slightly larger 1.6 L Z6/M-DE its due to variable valve timing on the intake cam (S-VT).

Applications:
 1999-2003 Mazda Familia

ZM
  ZM-DE 
The ZM engine, has an identical bore yet slightly longer stroke than the ZL as well as a revised head with round intake and exhaust ports. It has exactly the same bore and stroke as the previous generation B6. Some European variants would use VICS on the intake manifold.

  ZM-II was a variant of the ZM designated to the company Haima to use on the Haima Family. When the Mazda contract to Haima expired the engine was rebranded as a ZM-D and no longer would bear any Mazda markings on the valve cover.

The   ZL-VE and   ZM-DE are closely related engines with an equal bore  and share some major parts. The ZL has a stroke of  whilst the ZM has .

Applications:
 1998-2002 Mazda Familia
 2003-2013 Mazda3

References

External links

Z
Straight-four engines
Gasoline engines by model